Six ships of the Royal Navy have borne the name HMS Volage:

  was a 22-gun sixth rate. She was the French privateer Volage, of 22 guns, that  captured in 1798; Volage was broken up in 1804.
  was a 22-gun sixth rate launched in 1807 and sold in 1818.
  was a 28-gun sixth rate launched in 1825. She was converted into a survey ship in 1847, lent to the War Department as a powder hulk in 1864 and broken up by 1874.
  was an iron screw corvette, ordered as HMS Cerberus but renamed in 1867 before being launched in 1869. She was broken up in 1904.
 HMS Volage was to have been a modified W-class destroyer but the order was cancelled in 1918.
  was a V-class destroyer launched in 1943. She was converted into an anti-submarine frigate in 1951 and sold in 1972.

Citations

Royal Navy ship names